Shreya Bugade-Sheth (born 2 February 1988) is an Indian television actress. She is known for her comedy skits in Chala Hawa Yeu Dya.

She honored with Newsmakers Achievers Awards 2022.

Early life 
Shreya was born on 2 February 1988 in Pune, but brought up in Mumbai. Her mother's name is Nutan Bugade. She did her schooling from St. Xavier High School and completed college from Mithibai College, Mumbai.

Career 
She started her career in acting as a child artist from the Marathi drama Vatevarti Kacha Ga. She acted lots of plays in various languages. She made her debut with Tu Tithe Me serial in 2012. She also acted in many serials like Asmita, Tu Tithe Me, Fu Bai Fu, etc. She rose to prominence after her appearance in Chala Hawa Yeu Dya. She is a sole female lead in the show.

Personal life 
In 2015, she married Nikhil Sheth, the Associate Creative Head of Zee Marathi.

Television

Stage works

References

External links 
 

1988 births
Living people
Actresses in Marathi television
Actresses in Gujarati cinema
Indian stand-up comedians
St. Xavier's College, Mumbai alumni